Roman Sergeyevich Vasyanov,  (Russian: Роман Сергеевич Васьянов; born October 24, 1980, in Moscow) is a Russian cinematographer. He is best known for his collaborations with director David Ayer and the Russian musical film Stilyagi, for which he was nominated for a Golden Eagle Award for Best Cinematography.

Life and career 
Roman Vasyanov was born on October 24, 1980, in Moscow, in a Russian family. As a child, he was engaged in photography with his father, who worked at the ZIL automobile plant. Made photos and videos as a freelancer for magazines and newspapers. Later, thanks to his father's friend M. D. Koroptsov, he got acquainted with the profession of a cameraman. In 1998 he entered VGIK (workshop of V. I. Yusov). At the XXIV International Film Festival VGIK received the prize for the best camera work in the film "Hide and Seek" (dir. V. Panov). While studying at VGIK, he worked as an assistant cameraman to Yu. Raisky on the set of the cult TV series Brigada. Graduated from VGIK in 2003. Filmed over 300 commercials for Philips, Puma, Budweiser, Dell, Pepsi and others.

In 2008, he was cinematographer for Valery Todorovsky's cult film Stilyagi. In 2012 he worked on David Ayer's police thriller End of Watch, which earned him a nomination as Best cinematographer at the 28th Independent Spirit Awards. Afterwards Vasyanov worked on the movies The Motel Life and The East.

Vasyanov again teamed up with Ayer for the World War II film Fury and the comic book adaptation Suicide Squad.

Vasyanov is a member of Russian Guild of Cinematographers, and American Society of Cinematographers since 2022.

Filmography 

As director and writer
 Hostel (2021)

Awards 
 2010 - Kinotavr - Best Cinematography (Act of Nature)

References

External links 
 Official website
 

1980 births
Living people
Mass media people from Moscow
Russian cinematographers
Russian film directors
Russian screenwriters
Russian activists against the 2022 Russian invasion of Ukraine